The Gibraltar national football team represents Gibraltar in international football competitions, and is controlled by the Gibraltar Football Association. Gibraltar applied for full Union of European Football Associations (UEFA) membership and was accepted by the UEFA Congress in May 2013. It can therefore compete in the UEFA European Championship starting with the 2016 tournament for which the team competed in UEFA Euro 2016 qualifying Group D. On 13 May 2016 Gibraltar became a member of FIFA at the governing body's 66th Congress which was held in Mexico City. Gibraltar is the second smallest UEFA member in terms of population (only San Marino has a smaller population) and the smallest in terms of area.

Despite not being an island, Gibraltar set up its first official side for the football competition at the 1993 Island Games and has been a regular in the tournament, winning the 2007 edition.

History

Pre-UEFA
Gibraltar's first unofficial national match took place against Jersey in the 1993 Island Games in the Isle of Wight, although the team had previously played friendlies versus professional and amateur clubs. The result was a 2–1 loss for the Gibraltarians. Gibraltar's largest unofficial win was 19–0 versus Sark, in St. Martin, Guernsey, whilst their largest unofficial loss was 5–0 versus Greenland – an autonomous region of Denmark – which also took part on the Isle of Wight, in Freshwater.

Foundation
The history of the Gibraltarian national football side can be traced back to April 1923, when it travelled to Spain to play club side Sevilla in a friendly; two games were played and Gibraltar lost both 2–0 and 5–0. The side also managed a draw with Real Madrid in 1949.

Island Games
Before joining UEFA, Gibraltar competed in numerous football competitions, most regularly in the Island Games.

The first competition the team entered was the 1993 Island Games, despite Gibraltar not being an island. Gibraltar lost all of its matches, scoring only one goal and finishing in last place.

They had much more success in the 1995 Island Games, which they hosted. Despite losing their opening game against Greenland, Gibraltar bounced back to record their first competitive win, against the Isle of Man. Another victory over Anglesey saw Gibraltar finish second in the group, ahead of Anglesey only on goal difference, and qualify for the semi finals. There, they beat Jersey 1–0, before losing the final to the Isle of Wight by the same scoreline.

In the 1997 Island Games, two wins and two losses in the group stage, followed by a defeat to Shetland in a playoff, saw Gibraltar finish 6th out of 9 teams. Another poor performance in 1999 saw them finish 11th.

Island Games results improved slightly in 2001, as they came 5th, and in 2003 Gibraltar recorded their biggest win ever, defeating Sark 19–0. Other good results against Greenland and Orkney saw them finish 6th out of 12. Despite these minor successes, Gibraltar did not enter the 2005 tournament.

A football team represented Gibraltar at the 2015 edition of the games even after Gibraltar was accepted by UEFA. However, the squad was a development team composed of under-19s and over-aged players with no first team senior squad members taking part. The team was coached by John Moreno.

FIFI "Wild Cup"
In early summer 2006 Gibraltar participated in the 2006 FIFI Wild Cup where it was ranked 3rd. The tournament was an alternative World Cup for non-FIFA members, which was only held once. In Gibraltar's opening match, they drew 1–1 with the hosts, the 'Republic of St. Pauli', before beating Tibet 5–0 in their second group game to qualify for the semi-finals. There they lost 2–0 to eventual champions Turkish Republic of Northern Cyprus - following Gibraltar's games against Cyprus in 2018 FIFA World Cup qualification games in 2017, Gibraltar achieved a rare feat of playing both Cypriot national teams. In the third place playoff, Gibraltar had a rematch against St. Pauli. This time Gibraltar were able to defeat the hosts, to finish in third place out of the six teams.

2008 Four Nations
In 2008 Gibraltar accepted an invitation to participate in The Four Nations Tournament, the most prominent senior football tournament that Gibraltar had ever participated in. The 2008 Four Nations Tournament, won by England C, was played in North Wales, and was contested between Wales Semi-Pro, England C, Scotland B and guest nation Gibraltar after Northern Ireland decided not to take part. Though Gibraltar eventually finished bottom of the group, they pushed tournament winners England C close.

FIFA membership
After becoming a member of UEFA (see below), the GFA aimed to become a full FIFA member in time to participate in 2018 FIFA World Cup qualification. On 26 September 2014, it was announced that Gibraltar's application for FIFA membership was denied, with president Sepp Blatter stating that Gibraltar is ineligible because it is not an independent country. This was despite FIFA at the time including 22 members that are not independent countries, including five in UEFA (Faroe Islands and the four Home Nations of the United Kingdom).  The Gibraltar Football Association then announced that it planned to appeal to the Court of Arbitration for Sport, the same process by which Gibraltar successfully gained UEFA membership in 2013. The CAS heard Gibraltar's case on 21 May 2015, at which time no time frame for a verdict was announced and further legal arguments would still be heard. It was expected that no decision would be reached before the FIFA congress coming the following week. A ruling was announced on 2 May 2016, nearly a year after the CAS heard Gibraltar's case. As part of the ruling, FIFA was ordered to transmit Gibraltar's application for membership to the FIFA congress which was set to take place the following week in Mexico City. Additionally, FIFA was ordered to take "all necessary steps to admit the Gibraltar Football Association as a full member of FIFA without delay." If the vote held at the congress was successful, it was believed that Gibraltar would be a last-minute addition to 2018 FIFA World Cup qualification. In FIFA's official statement regarding the ruling, the organization said that it expected to discuss the matter at the upcoming congress and discuss a course of action, including potentially altering the congress agenda to submit Gibraltar's application for membership. On 13 May 2016, Gibraltar was accepted as a member of FIFA with a vote of 172 to 12 in favour. Gibraltar became FIFA's 211th member immediately after the Football Federation of Kosovo was voted member 210.

UEFA acceptance

Gibraltar first applied for UEFA membership in 1999 but was rejected because of intense opposition from Spain.  Spain's opposition stemmed not only from claiming ownership of the territory but from fear that Gibraltar's acceptance would set a precedent that would inspire the separatist Basque national football team and Catalan national football teams to apply for UEFA membership as well. The issue was voted on again in 2007 but only three member nations (England, Scotland, and Wales) supported Gibraltar's bid after Spain threatened to withdraw Spanish teams from all UEFA competitions. UEFA then established rules, which were introduced following pressure from Spain, restricting membership to sovereign states recognised as such by the United Nations. The Gibraltar FA then went to the Court of Arbitration for Sport in 2007 and again in 2011 after an appeal and it was ruled that Gibraltar could not be refused membership because the sovereignty rules were not established until after Gibraltar's 1999 and 2007 applications.  At this time, Gibraltar was named a provisional member of UEFA and was granted permission to enter national teams in under-17 and under-19 tournaments for the first time.

The GFA was accepted as a full UEFA member by resolution of the UEFA Congress held in London on 24 May 2013, with only Spain and Belarus opposed. This meant Gibraltar became the smallest UEFA member by population, behind San Marino, then Liechtenstein and the Faroe Islands. As a result of the vote, the Gibraltar national team became eligible to enter the qualification tournaments for UEFA's premier national team competition, the European Championship. The first such opportunity was the Euro 2016 qualifying campaign, which would kick off in September 2014. Following the examples of Armenia–Azerbaijan and Russia–Georgia, it was confirmed that Gibraltar and Spain would be kept apart in qualifying groups.

After being accepted into UEFA, the GFA outlined adjusted eligibility criteria for the selection of players for the national squad. To be eligible, a player must be a British passport holder who was born in Gibraltar, or has Gibraltarian parents or grandparents, or has attended school for five years locally. Former Manchester United, Derby County, Southampton and Stoke City defender Danny Higginbotham, whose uncle Allen Bula was the team manager, was eligible to be called up because of this criteria adjustment. On 18 September 2013, Higginbotham announced that he agreed in "principle" to play for Gibraltar. Recruiting of English-born players by manager Allen Bula was unpopular with some fans, and in 2015 Bula's successor Jeff Wood said he would use more home-based players and develop local talent while still searching for eligible players elsewhere.

Gibraltar's first official international match was a 0–0 friendly draw against Slovakia, on 19 November 2013 at the Estadio Algarve in Portugal. On 23 February 2014, Gibraltar was drawn in Group D for the UEFA Euro 2016 qualifying alongside Germany, Poland, Georgia, Republic of Ireland and Scotland. Initially, Gibraltar were drawn into the same group as Spain for the tournament but the previous decision to keep the two teams apart in qualifying rounds was upheld and Gibraltar was immediately moved into another group. This was their first time participating in an official European competition.
In June 2014, Gibraltar recorded their first ever victory under UEFA with a 1–0 win against Malta, the goal coming from Kyle Casciaro.

Euro 2016 qualifying
On 7 September 2014, Gibraltar played their first competitive match – a Euro 2016 qualifier against Poland. Despite coming into the game with optimism and excitement, they were still massive underdogs and although the half time score was only 1–0 to Poland, it ended 7–0. On 11 October 2014, they were defeated once again by 7–0, this time by Republic of Ireland, in their second Euro 2016 qualifier. In their third match, they were beaten for the third time by Georgia 3–0.

On 29 March 2015, Gibraltar scored their first ever goal in a full international competitive match. Lee Casciaro scored against Scotland at Hampden Park, Glasgow during the first half to level the match at 1–1. However, Scotland went on to win 6–1. In July 2015, Englishman Jeff Wood was appointed manager, succeeding caretaker Dave Wilson who took over from Gibraltar's first manager Allen Bula in March 2015. Gibraltar could not repeat their performance of scoring a goal in the next two matches; losing 7–0 away against Germany and 4–0 against Republic of Ireland. On 7 September 2015, Jake Gosling scored Gibraltar's second-ever competitive goal; netting a late consolation goal as his team was defeated 8–1 by Poland. Gibraltar finished its maiden qualifying campaign last in its group with zero points. With a 0–6 defeat to Scotland in the final match of qualifying, Gibraltar allowed 56 total goals throughout qualification, surpassing San Marino's previous record of 53 in a 10-match qualification process.

Stadium
Before being accepted into UEFA, the team played its home games at Victoria Stadium, the 5,000-seat national stadium of Gibraltar. There were plans to replace the stadium with a proposed 8,000-seat stadium at Europa Point, which was expected to be completed for UEFA Euro 2016 qualifying. Due to the lack of suitable facilities in Gibraltar, the team played its competitive home matches at Estádio Algarve about four hours away in Portugal, from 2013 until 2018. Former national team manager Allen Bula stated that the team would play at the stadium for "a few years" until the Europa Point Stadium was complete. Although the Victoria Stadium could not be used for qualifying matches, UEFA allowed its use for friendlies when Gibraltar chose to do so.

In December 2014 the GFA applied for an exemption from UEFA to allow for competitive matches to be held at the Victoria Stadium although it did not meet minimum requirements. The exemption was filed based upon UEFA regulations which allow for an exemption to be granted because of "hardship". At that time, UEFA said that all scheduled matches, such as those during Euro 2016 qualification, would take place in the already-determined locations but a determination would be made for future competitions. In February 2016 the Gibraltar government announced that over the previous four years numerous improvements had been made to the Victoria Stadium including the installation of approved AstroTurf and lighting which surpassed the requirements for a Category 2 stadium but did not quite meet Category 3. These improvements allowed for UEFA Champions League and Europa League matches to be played at the stadium.

In September 2015, after plans for Europa Point were abandoned, the GFA explored other sites including Lathbury Barracks, as UEFA were unwilling at the time to fund improvements to Victoria Stadium while it was government owned. In February 2016 the Government of Gibraltar announced that it expected to be presented for plans at the Lathbury site very soon. However, in 2017 a deal was agreed for the Gibraltar FA to purchase Victoria Stadium with UEFA funding, and re-develop the stadium to meet UEFA standards. The stadium was subsequently approved to host UEFA Euro 2020 qualifying games in March 2020. However, delays to the stadium redevelopment due to the COVID-19 pandemic meant that in October 2022 it was announced that Gibraltar would once again have to play competitive games in Portugal from March 2023 while their home stadium is rebuilt.

Results and fixtures

2022

2023

Personnel

Current technical staff
As of 23 June 2019

Coaching history
Up to date as of 19 November 2022

Players

Current squad
The following players were called up to the squad for the following UEFA Euro 2024 qualifying matches:
 Match date: 24 and 27 March 2023
 Opposition:  and 
 Caps and goals correct as of: 19 November 2022, after the match against .

Recent call-ups
The following players have been called up within the past twelve months.

INJ Withdrew from the squad due to an injury
PRE Preliminary squad
RET Retired from the national team
WD  Withdrew for other reasons

Player records

Players in bold are still active with Gibraltar.

Most appearances

Top goalscorers

Competitive record

FIFA World Cup

UEFA European Championship

UEFA Nations League

Island Games

*Gold background colour indicates that the tournament was won. Red border colour indicates tournament was held on home soil.

Four Nations

FIFI Wild Cup

Head-to-head record
The following table shows Gibraltar's all-time international record, correct as of 19 November 2022. Only official matches are included.

Non-FIFA record

Honours
Football at the Island Games:
Winners (1): 2007
Runners-up (1):  1995

See also

 Football in Gibraltar
 List of football clubs in Gibraltar

Footnotes

References

External links

Official site of the Gibraltar Football Association
FIFA profile
UEFA Profile
Island Games results
FIFI World Cup results
All-time results at Rec.Sport.Soccer Statistics Foundation
Gibraltarian Squads and Players
Unofficial website about Gibraltarian football, futsal and national team

 
European national association football teams